American Speech is a quarterly academic journal of the American Dialect Society, established in 1925 and currently published by  Duke University Press. It focuses primarily on the English language used in the Western Hemisphere, but also publishes contributions on other varieties of English, outside influences on the language, and linguistic theory.

The current editor is Thomas Purnell (University of Wisconsin–Madison).

The  Chronicle of Higher Education's Lingua Franca  considers it a  "consistently reliable peer-reviewed source of information" and states that  "though it is scholarly and research based, there’s a surprising amount of information that is intelligible to anyone, even without special training in linguistics."

History 
The journal was established in 1925 by Kemp Malone, Louise Pound, and Arthur G. Kennedy "to present information about English in America in a form appealing to general readers", and was inspired by H. L. Mencken.

According to Mencken:

It became the official journal of the American Dialect Society in 1970.

Among the New Words

In addition to research articles, American Speech publishes a section titled "Among the New Words", which reports on recent neologisms and provides lexicographical documentation of their uses and origins. The section was introduced to the journal in 1941 by Dwight Bolinger. The section frequently discusses the words nominated for the American Dialect Society's Word of the Year selection.

Abstracting and indexing
This journal is indexed by the following services:
 Arts and Humanities Citation Index
 Current Contents/Arts and Humanities 
 Current Contents/Social and Behavioral Sciences
 Social Sciences Citation Index
 Scopus
 Academic Search
 H. W. Wilson Company databases

References

External links 

 

Publications established in 1925
Linguistics journals
Quarterly journals
English-language journals
Duke University Press academic journals